Maz Maz (mazmaz) is one of the major brands of processed food in Iran.

The Kishchips (1990) and Felix (2011) are companies that sell their products by this brand.

Products

Maz Maz has grown into a leading manufacturer of high quality potato chips, processed nuts and snacks, and today it provides many kind of tastes in chips product as well as snacks and dried nuts in Iran, and also at an international level.

References

Food brands of Iran